The Chʼoltiʼ language is an extinct Mayan language which was spoken by the Manche Chʼol people of eastern Guatemala and southern Belize. The post-colonial stage of the language is only known from a single manuscript written between 1685 and 1695 which was first studied by Daniel Garrison Brinton. Chʼoltiʼ belongs to the Choʼlan branch of the Mayan languages and is closely related to Chontal and especially Chʼortiʼ. The Chʼoltiʼ language has become of particular interest for the study of Mayan Hieroglyphs since it seems that most of the glyphic texts are written in an ancient variety of Chʼoltiʼ called Classic Chʼoltiʼan or Classic Maya by epigraphers and which is thought to have been spoken as a prestige dialect throughout the Maya area in the Classic Era.

Notes

References
 
 
 
 
 
 

Mesoamerican languages
Extinct languages of North America
Mayan languages
Languages extinct in the 18th century